Esko Prague is a commuter rail or S-Bahn system, part of the Prague Integrated Transport (PID), serving the city of Prague and the surrounding areas of the Central Bohemian Region. Train lines that are included in the PID system are labeled by letter S (or R) and a number, e.g. S1 or S88. On these lines, PID tickets can be used. Long-distance fast trains are not integrated in the system.

It has been in operation under its current name since December 9, 2007. part of the Prague Integrated Transport system serving the city of Prague and the surrounding areas of the Central Bohemian Region. It is primarily operated by the České dráhy.

The system was significantly improved after the completion of the so-called Nové spojení between southern and northern parts of the system in 2008.

Lines 

( ) = section with limited service only 

{ } = section not part of the Esko-System

Since 2011 December, almost all local tracks in Central Bohemian Region were involved in the Esko numbering (some lines were enhanced and 13 new line numbers assigned). Three lines are interconnected with lines of RegioTakt Ústí nad Labem Region: S4+U4, S32+U32 and S40+U40.

Numbering system
The lines are numbered according to the following system: The main lines are numbered with one-digit numbers, starting east and following in the counter-clockwise direction. Then, the connecting lines (S12, S29, S41) are numbered with two-digit numbers, composing of the numbers of the main lines to which they connect. The lines named "R3" etc. are fast trains which run along the same tracks as the S-lines but still stop at multiple stations integrated into the PID system.

Plans for the future
In the future, it is planned to improve the system significantly, mostly by building new stations on existing lines, upgrading the lines, and integrating more of the existing lines to the system. The Nové spojení 2 is a planned underground tunnel with new stations in the inner city, which will free up capacity on existing lines for longer distance services.

There are also plans to build completely new lines, such as a branch from the station Praha-Ruzyně to the Václav Havel Airport.

References

External links 

 
 Network map 
 Prague-Kladno (Czech) - website of the project to upgrade the Prague-Kladno line (S5) together with building a branch to the airport

Rail transport in Prague